WPON (1460 AM) is a radio station in the Detroit market, broadcasting from a 6-tower array in Walled Lake, Michigan. WPON was founded in September 1954, with studios in Pontiac, Michigan, and towers located at the corner of Square Lake Road and Telegraph Road in neighboring Bloomfield Hills, Michigan.

History
The station was owned for many years by Chief Pontiac Broadcasting, broadcasting such formats as top-40 and Country music. Broadcasting at 1000 watts omnidirectional, the station covered the majority of Oakland County. The station was sold in 1986 to Algis Zaparakis, who in turn sold the land containing the tower array in Bloomfield Hills to developers, and moved the tower array to a swamp near Wolverine Lake in Walled Lake, Michigan. The move forced WPON to change its power to 1000 watts directional daytime, and 760 watts directional nighttime. This change in power saw many of WPON's listeners unable to pick up the station's signal in much of its former coverage area. The format was changed to ethnic in 1986, and stayed this way until the station was purchased in 1995 by Foreign Radio Programs, Inc. Under the leadership of station manager Marie Fotion, WPON started a semi-successful "Talk and Oldies" brokered radio format in 1997, specializing in hard-to-find oldies from the 1950s through the early 1970s. More recently the station also began airing pre-rock "traditional" pop/nostalgia hits from the early and mid-1950s mixed in with the rock and roll oldies, possibly to appease fans of CKWW, a former adult standards station which now also plays rock oldies.

WPON was again sold in 2003 to Birach Broadcasting Corporation, who closed the old Bloomfield Hills studios and moved operations to Birach headquarters located in the Town Center Plaza in Southfield, Michigan. WPON is streaming their "Talk and Rare Oldies" format live through their website.

Shows, hosts and DJs
Through the years, WPON was home for many of to metro-Detroit area's finest on-air talent, aspiring and seasoned alike.

For many years, "Crazy Al" (Allyn Schmitz) hosted the morning show "Crazy Al's Radio Party" along with Larry Matthews and others. The program saw a variety of guests from the community as well as moderately popular "oldies" musicians. Crazy Al, known for his wildly over-the-top personality brought rare oldies and talk to the community until Al and the gang left WPON in May 2004, shortly after the sale of the station to Birach Broadcasting Corporation. Al continues broadcasting his show via  

Travel aficionado, Michael Dwyer hosted weekly radio program "Travel and Adventure" for many years. Dwyer, a freelance travel columnist in Detroit, brought his love for traveling to the airwaves of WPON. Dwyer also worked as a board operator, and like many others, left the station shortly after being sold. Dwyer, along with Jimmy James, and Ted Eberly were said to have left WPON in July 2004 because an agreement could not be reached between them and new owner Birach Broadcasting.

WJR veteran Bryan Styble hosted a midnight show "The Pontiac Insomniac with Bryan Styble" weeknights from October 1996 through November 1998.  That overnight timeslot on the weekends was filled by Anthony Torres and his "Thinking Aloud with Anthony Torres" call-in program during the same period.

WPON is widely known throughout Detroit's large Indian American and Desi population. It has many shows featuring Hindi and other Indian language songs in the superhit Rockin' Raaga hosted by Anu, Geetmala and Voice of Pakistan.

Deano Day http://www.mcrfb.com/?p=29545 also had a long running show on WPON.

The popular Improv Troupe," Void Where Prohibited,' also had a 2-year stint on WPON with a call in improv radio show. Hosted by founders Pat Caporuscio and Tommy Ventimiglio, then troupe' founders

Programming shifted to WCXI
In October 2010, WPON went silent so the station could make improvements to its broadcast signal. Programming has been shifted to co-owned WCXI in Fenton broadcasting from the WPON studio and still streaming from the WPON web site. Birach relocated WPON and WCXI to the same broadcast tower near Wixom, Michigan, a few miles west of the old WPON site (which has been razed).  Both WPON and WCXI were issued construction permits for new facilities from the new site, WCXI for 15,000 watts days and 1,000 watts nights, and WPON for 670 watts days and 175 watts nights. As of December 2019, WPON has been on air offering oldies in the morning.

See also
Media in Detroit

References

External links

PON
Oldies radio stations in the United States
Radio stations established in 1954
Birach Broadcasting Corporation stations